Oliver Twist is a 1912 British silent drama film directed by Thomas Bentley and starring Ivy Millais, Alma Taylor and Harry Royston. It is an adaptation of the 1838 novel Oliver Twist by Charles Dickens. It was the directorial debut of Bentley who went on to become a leading British director. It was the first in a series of Dickens adaptations by Bentley.

Plot summary

Cast
 Ivy Millais as Oliver Twist
 Alma Taylor as Nancy
 John McMahon as Fagin
 Harry Royston as Bill Sykes
 Flora Morris as Rose Maylie
 Mr. Rivary as Mr. Brownlow
 Willie West as Artful Dodger

Bibliography
 Giddings, Robert & Sheen, Erica. From Page To Screen: Adaptations of the Classic Novel . Manchester University Press, 5 May 2000
 Mee, John. The Cambridge Introduction to Charles Dickens. Cambridge University Press, 2010.

References

External links
 
 
 

1912 films
1910s historical drama films
British historical drama films
1910s English-language films
Films directed by Thomas Bentley
British silent feature films
Films based on Oliver Twist
Films set in the 19th century
Films set in London
Hepworth Pictures films
British black-and-white films
1912 drama films
1910s British films
Silent drama films